"The Folk Singer" is a song written by Merle Kilgore and performed by Tommy Roe.  It reached number 4 in the United Kingdom, number 20 in Australia, number 34 in Canada, and number 84 on the Billboard Hot 100 in 1963.  It was later featured on his 1966 album, Sweet Pea.

The song was produced by Felton Jarvis.

References

1963 songs
1963 singles
Songs written by Merle Kilgore
Tommy Roe songs
Song recordings produced by Felton Jarvis
ABC Records singles